Maha Dewi was a Burmese royal title.

It may mean:
 Maha Dewi of Hanthawaddy:  Regent of Hanthawaddy (r. 1383–1384)
 Maha Dewi of Toungoo:  Queen of the Western Palace of Toungoo (r. 1510–1530)
 Wisutthithewi: Queen Regnant of Lan Na (r. 1564-1578)
 Maha Dewi (Sanay Min):  Chief Queen Consort of Toungoo Dynasty (r. 1698–1714)
 Maha Dewi Saw Nyein Oo:  Queen Mother of King Alaungpaya